The Swedish Handball Federation (SHF) is the national handball association in Sweden.

The Swedish Handball Federation was founded  out of the Swedish Game Association on 25 November 1930 and joined the Swedish Sports Confederation (RF) in 1931. It is also a member of the Swedish Olympic Committee (SOK), the European Handball Federation (EHF) and the International Handball Federation (IHF). Its headquarters are in Stockholm.

In 1948, the Swedish Handball Federation set up a basketball section, which existed until the October 1952 establishment of the Swedish Basketball Federation.

Its chairperson, since August 2016, is Fredrik Rapp.

SHF Presidents

Competitions hosted

International
 1954 World Men's Handball Championship
 1967 World Men's Handball Championship
 1977 Men's Junior World Handball Championship
 1979 Men's Junior World Handball Championship
 1993 World Men's Handball Championship
 2011 World Men's Handball Championship
 2023 World Men's Handball Championship
 2023 World Women's Handball Championship

Continental
 2002 European Men's Handball Championship
 2006 European Women's Handball Championship
 2016 European Women's Handball Championship
 2020 European Men's Handball Championship

References

External links
  

Handball in Sweden
Handball
Sweden
1930 establishments in Sweden
Sports organizations established in 1930